Kris Kemist is a British record producer and founder of the UK based independent label Reality Shock Records who has worked with vocalists such as Errol Dunkley, Fred Locks, Macka B, Earl Sixteen and Tippa Irie amongst others; releasing eight albums and 22 vinyl records to date.

Career
Kris Kemist began his musical career managing Jamaican reggae singer Mikey Murka in the early 2000s. In 2003, he launched Reality Shock Records, originally working with reggae artists Deadly Hunta, Aqua Livi, Smiley, Errol Bellot and Afrikan Simba. His label went on to release a string of records and albums including a compilation entitled Reality Shock Volume 1 (2008).
 
Kris Kemist's reggae influenced productions are described as "heavy enough for the UK dub rigs, yet melodic enough for home listening" in a BBC review of his 2010 album Solo Banton – Walk Like Rasta. In the summer of 2011, Kemist's production featuring vocals by the Canadian reggae singer Tony Anthony reached number 1 in the Italian Reggae Chart, and number 2 in the New York Chart.

Productions such as 'YT – Express Yourself' and 'Luciano – Bear Jah Fruit' were played by David Rodigan (MBE) on Kiss FM and BBC Radio 1Xtra 

As well as producing for Reality Shock, Kris Kemist has also recorded vocalists and mixed tracks for several other labels including Mungos Hifi's/Scotch Bonnet (UK) Jahtari (GER) and Jahmanican Records (FR).

In 2016, Kris Kemist produced and released a various artists reggae album featuring new artists he had not previously released before; introducing newcomer Rudie Rich who had his song "Teach Dem" from the album premiered exclusively by BBC Radio Berkshire.

References

External links

Year of birth missing (living people)
Living people
British DJs
British founders
British record producers